Marticorenia is a genus of flowering plants in the family Asteraceae.

There is only one known species, Marticorenia foliosa, endemic to Chile.

References

Monotypic Asteraceae genera
Nassauvieae
Endemic flora of Chile